We Trisig Shangnyen (? – 721), also known as Shang Trisig, was a general of the Tibetan Empire. In Chinese records, his name was given as Qǐ Lìxú.

After Tridu Songtsen's death in 'Jang (Nanzhao), Tibet had to face many difficulties, including unstable political situation, vassal kingdom's rebellion, and military conflict with Tang China. Trisig was appointed as Lönchen after his predecessor Khu Mangpoje Lhasung's betrayal and execution in 705. It proved that he was an excellent assistant. With his help, the powerful empress regent Khri ma lod quickly put down the rebellion, and re-established the king's authority. His term also saw the royal marriage of Me Agtsom and the Chinese Princess Jincheng (金城公主).

He led 100,000 troops to invade Tang China together with bod da rgyal in 714, but was defeated by Chinese general Xue Ne.

References
Old Tibetan Annals (version I), I.T.J. 0750
Old Tibetan Chronicle, P.T. 1287
New Book of Tang, vol. 230

8th-century Tibetan people
People of the Tibetan Empire
721 deaths
Date of birth unknown
Tang–Tibet relations